Decoration Day refers to traditions of cemetery decoration and ritual, including:
 Decoration Day (Appalachia and Liberia), a living tradition of cemetery decoration and ritual which arose by the 19th century
 Decoration Day (Canada), a Canadian holiday
 Decoration Day is also the former name of Memorial Day, a United States holiday.

Decoration Day traditions have also been the topic of works of art, including:
 Decoration Day (album), a 2003 album by Drive-By Truckers
 Decoration Day (film), a 1990 American film based on a novel by John William Corrington
 "Decoration Day", the second movement of A Symphony: New England Holidays by American composer Charles Ives
 "Decoration Day" (song), a song by Sonny Boy Williamson I, later performed by John Lee Hooker on the album It Serve You Right to Suffer